The following is a list of notable deaths in May 1998.

Entries for each day are listed alphabetically by surname. A typical entry lists information in the following sequence:
 Name, age, country of citizenship at birth, subsequent country of citizenship (if applicable), reason for notability, cause of death (if known), and reference.

May 1998

1
Eldridge Cleaver, 62, American writer and political activist, prostate cancer.
Heinie Heltzel, 84, American baseball player.
Brian Kendall, 51, New Zealand boxer, cancer.
J. S. Roskell, 84, English historian of the Middle Ages.

2
Clyde Connell, 96, American abstract expressionist sculptor.
Justin Fashanu, 37, English footballer, suicide.
Johnny Grodzicki, 81, American baseball player.
Hide, 33, Japanese musician, suicide by hanging.
Kevin Lloyd, 49, English actor (The Bill), alcoholism.
Maidie Norman, 85, American actress and literature and theater teacher, lung cancer.
Carey Wilber, 81, American journalist and television writer.

3
Jesse Alto, 71, American poker player.
Erich Bergel, 67, German flutist and conductor.
Louis Berry, 83, African American civil rights attorney.
Erika Cheetham, 58, English writer.
Johannes Driessler, 77, German composer, organist, and lecturer.
Tom Elliot, 72, Scottish rugby player.
Jean-Baptiste Hachème, 68, Beninese military officer and politician.
Raimund Harmstorf, 58, German actor, suicide by hanging.
David Vincent Hooper, 82, British chess player and writer.
Venkatesh Kulkarni, Indian-American novelist and academic, leukemia.
Loren MacIver, 89, American painter.
René Mugica, 88, Argentine actor, film director and screenwriter.
Gene Raymond, 89, American actor, pneumonia.
Les Samuels, 69, English footballer.
Xue Yue, 101, Chinese Nationalist military general.
Gojko Šušak, 53, Croatian politician, lung cancer.

4
Gordon Beningfield, 61, English wildlife artist, broadcaster and naturalist.
Alois Estermann, 43, Swiss officer of the Pontifical Swiss Guard, murdered.
Albert Glasser, 82, American composer, conductor and arranger of B-movie music.
Theodor Oberländer, 93, German Ostforschung scientist and politician.
Nicolò Rode, 86, Italian sailor and Olympic champion.

5
Juan Gimeno, 84, Spanish road cyclist.
Alan Glyn, 79, British politician.
Tommy McCook, 71, Jamaican saxophonist, pneumonia and heart failure.
Eleanor Ragsdale, 72, American civil rights activist.
Frithjof Schuon, 90, Swiss author, poet and painter.
Paul Seymour, 70, American basketball player and coach.

6
Chatchai Chunhawan, 78, Thai army officer, diplomat and politician, liver cancer.
Sybil Connolly, 77, Irish fashion designer.
Juan Antonio García Díez, 57, American politician, liver cancer.
Aleksei Gritsai, 84, Soviet and Russian artist.
John Joseph, 65, Pakistani Roman Catholic bishop, suicide.
Arvid Laurin, 96, Swedish sailor and Olympic medalist.
Erich Mende, 81, German politician, Vice-Chancellor of West Germany.

7
Blue Lu Barker, 84, American jazz and blues singer.
Allan McLeod Cormack, 74, South African American physicist, cancer.
István Hasznos, 73, Hungarian water polo player and Olympic champion (1952).
Jack Heslop-Harrison, 78, British soldier and botanist, heart attack.
John Meyers, 58, American football player, heart problems.
Eddie Rabbitt, 56, American singer and songwriter, lung cancer.
Allen Wikgren, 91, American theologian and New Testament scholar.

8
Donald Stephen Lowell Cardwell, 78, British historian of science and technology.
Jacques Dumesnil, 94, French film and television actor.
Johannes Kotkas, 83, Estonian Greco-Roman wrestler and Olympic champion (1952).
Raymond Premru, 63, American trombonist and compose, esophageal cancer.
Jennings Randolph, 96, American politician.
Charles Rebozo, 85, American banker and businessman.

9
Lester Butler, 38, American blues harmonica player and singer, drug overdose.
Donald Conroy, 77, United States Marine Corps colonel.
Bernard Dwork, 74, American mathematician.
Alice Faye, 83, American actress and singer, stomach cancer.
Rudolf Ismayr, 89, German weightlifter and Olympic champion.
Rommie Loudd, 64, American gridiron football player, coach, and executive, diabetes.
Talat Mahmood, 74, Indian playback singer, heart attack.
Bob Mellish, Baron Mellish, 85, British politician.
Earl R. Parker, 85, American engineer and professor.
Nat Perrin, 93, American comedy screenwriter, producer and director.
R. J. G. Savage, 70, British palaeontologist, pancreatic cancer.
Gerhard Siedl, 69, German football player.
Marianne Strengell, 88, Finnish-American modernist textile designer.

10
Lajos Czinege, 74, Hungarian military officer and politician.
José Francisco Antonio Peña Gómez, 61, Dominican Republic politician, pulmonary edema.
Robert Jewell, 78, Australian actor (Doctor Who).
Oreste Kirkop, 74, Maltese singer.
Cesare Perdisa, 65, Italian racing driver.
Ronald Ridenhour, 52, American soldier during the Vietnam War, heart attack.
Clara Rockmore, 87, American classical violin prodigy and theremin performer.
Sumitro, 71, Indonesian general.
George Wright, 77, American organist.

11
Willy Corsari, 100, Dutch actor, author and composer.
Gene Fowler Jr., 80, American film editor (It's a Mad, Mad, Mad, Mad World, Hang 'Em High).
Ernst Ising, 98, German physicist.
John Morrison, 94, Australian novelist and short story writer.
Hans van Zon, 57, Dutch serial killer, alcohol poisoning.

12
Myoung Hwa Cho, 44, American murder victim, homicide by asphyxiation.
Hermann Lenz, 85, German writer, poet, and novelist.
John McCarthy, 81, American gridiron football player.
Graham Shaw, 63, English football player.

13
Gunnar Jansson, 90, Swedish football player.
Oscar G. Johnson, 77, United States Army soldier and recipient of the Medal of Honor.
Chantal Mauduit, 34, French alpinist, climbing accident.
Frank Ragano, 75, American mafia lawyer.

14
Mabel Esther Allan, 83, British children's author.
Bill Bishop, 67, American gridiron football player.
Garth Boesch, 77, American ice hockey player.
Tom D'Andrea, 88, American actor.
Marjory Stoneman Douglas, 108, American journalist, writer and conservationist.
Charlie Hall, 50, American gridiron football player.
Geoffrey Kendal, 88, English actor.
Floyd Lounsbury, 84, American linguist, anthropologist and epigrapher.
Yitzhak Moda'i, 72, Israeli politician.
Shawkat Osman, 81, Bangladeshi novelist and short story writer.
Karl Schmid, 87, Swiss rower and Olympic medalist.
Frank Sinatra, 82, American singer ("My Way", "That's Life") and actor (From Here to Eternity), Oscar winner (1954), heart attack.
Mahmud of Terengganu, 68, Malaysian sultan.
Jade Wilson, 21, New Zealand squash player, suicide.

15
Joe Cibulas, 77, American football player.
Gunter d'Alquen, 87, German nazi correspondent.
John Hawkes, 72, American novelist.
Richard Jaeger, 85, German politician.
Earl Manigault, 53, American basketball player, congestive heart failure.
Packy Rogers, 85, American baseball player, manager and scout.
Naim Talu, 78, Turkish politician and former Prime Minister of Turkey.
Patrick Wall, 81, British commando during World War II and later a politician.

16
Pierre Cardinal, 73, French screenwriter and director.
Idov Cohen, 88, Romanian-Israeli politician and journalist.
Milan Creighton, 90, American football player and coach.
William Alexander Hewitt, 83, American diplomat and businessman.
Rufino Linares, 47, American baseball player, traffic collision.

17
Genie Chance, 71, American journalist, radio broadcaster and politician.
Hugh Cudlipp, 84, British journalist and newspaper editor.
Nina Dorliak, 89, Russian soprano and a voice teacher.
Gasper Urban, 75, American gridiron football player.
Sarojini Yogeswaran, 97, Sri Lankan politician.

18
Obaidullah Aleem, Indian poet, heart failure.
Odd Engström, 56, Swedish politician, heart attack.
Roy Evans, 88, Welsh table tennis player.
Enid Marx, 95, English painter and designer.

19
Edwin Astley, 76, British composer.
Hank Earl Carr, 30, American murderer and spree killer, suicide by gunshot.
Leela Devi, 66, Indian writer, translator, and teacher.
Dorothy Donegan, 76, American jazz pianist and vocalist, cancer.
Teresa Prekerowa, 76, Polish historian and author.
Sōsuke Uno, 75, Japanese politician and Prime Minister of Japan, lung cancer.

20
Chuck Bloedorn, 85, American basketball player.
Tom Bolack, 80, American businessman and politician.
Linwood G. Dunn, 93, American visual effects artist (West Side Story, It's a Mad, Mad, Mad, Mad World, Mighty Joe Young).
Ricardo Franco, 48, Spanish screenwriter and film director, heart attack.
Jacob Katz, 93, Israeli historian and educator.
Wolf Mankowitz, 73, English writer, playwright and screenwriter, cancer.
Walter McKinnon, 87, New Zealand Army officer.
Robert Normann, 81, Norwegian jazz guitarist.
Alfredo Yabrán, 53, Argentine businessman and associate of Carlos Menem, suicide.
Santiago Álvarez, 79, Cuban filmmaker, Parkinson's disease.

21
Erik Bladström, 80, Swedish sprint canoeist and Olympic champion.
Li Bo, 69, Chinese ecologist, traffic collision.
Pedro Escartín, 95, Spanish football player, referee, coach, and author.
Douglas Fowley, 86, American actor (Singin' in the Rain, The Life and Legend of Wyatt Earp, Mighty Joe Young).
Robert Gist, 80, American actor and film director.
Jan Gullberg, 62, Swedish surgeon and science writer, stroke.
Jim Power, 102, Irish hurler.
Rajanala Kaleswara Rao, 73, Indian film actor.
Torgny Säve-Söderbergh, 83, Swedish writer  and professor of Egyptology.

22
Domenico Cantatore, 82, Italian painter.
John Derek, 71, American actor and film director, heart failure.
Arthur R. Gralla, 85, United States Navy Vice Admiral, pneumonia.
Fred Hatfield, 73, American baseball player.
Eddie MacCabe, 71, Canadian sports journalist and writer.
Robert W. Morgan, 60, American radio personality, lung cancer.
José Enrique Moyal, 87, Australian mathematical physicist.
Francisco Lucas Pires, 53, Portuguese lawyer, and politician.

23
Tony Halik, 77, Polish documentary film maker, author of travel books, and explorer.
Grace Hartman, Canadian social activist and politician.
Vic Kulbitski, 76, American gridiron football player.
Andreas Liebenberg, 60, South African military commander.
Ebbe Rode, 88, Danish stage and film actor, pneumonia.
Monroe K. Spears, American university professor and literary critic.
Telford Taylor, 90, American lawyer.

24
Francys Arsentiev, 40, American mountaineer, hypothermia and/or cerebral edema.
George Kelly, 82, American jazz tenor saxophonist.
Tommy Moore, 35, American golfer, primary amyloidosis.
Premnath Moraes, 75, Sri Lankan actor, film director and scriptwriter.
Lucio Muñoz, 68, Spanish painter and engraver.
Charles Rycroft, 83, British psychiatrist and psychoanalyst.

25
Steve Michael, 42, American HIV/AIDS activist, complications from AIDS.
Gary Thomas Row, 64, American informant for the FBI, heart attack.
Claude Stubbs, 93, Australian politician.
Todd Witsken, 34, American tennis player, brain cancer.

26
Emil Braginsky, 76, Soviet and Russian screenwriter.
Linda Hayes, 74, American rhythm and blues singer.
Edgar A. Silinsh, 71, Soviet and Latvian scientist.
Charlie White, 70, American baseball player.
Sergey Yablonsky, 73, Soviet and Russian mathematician.

27
Minoo Masani, 92, Indian politician.
Robert Muller, 72, German-British journalist and screenwriter.
Ghazaros Saryan, 77, Armenian composer.
Shu Tong, 92, Chinese politician.

28
Chung-Yao Chao, 95, Chinese theoretical physicist.
Ragnar Fjørtoft, 84, Norwegian meteorologist.
Bill Giles, 66, American football player and coach.
Phil Hartman, 49, Canadian-American comedian and actor (Saturday Night Live, NewsRadio, The Simpsons), Emmy winner (1989), shot.
Anatoliy Kabayda, 85, Ukrainian community and political activist.
Bill Meek, 77, American football player and coach.
Lana Morris, 68, British actress, heart attack.
George T. Oubre, 80, American politician.
Dieter Renner, 48, German football player and coach.
Giovanni Valetti, 84, Italian road racing cyclist.
Bill Williams, 37, American game designer, programmer and author, cystic fibrosis.

29
Orlando Anderson, 23, American gangster and suspected murderer of rapper Tupac Shakur, gunshot wound.
Eric Atkinson, 70, Barbados cricket player..
Ted Dunbar, 61, American jazz guitarist and composer, stroke.
Barry Goldwater, 89, American politician and author, complications from a stroke.
Hazel P. Heath, 88, American politician and entrepreneur.
Marion Milner, 98, British author and psychoanalyst.
Philip O'Connor, 81, British writer and surrealist poet.

30
Sam Aaronovitch, 78, British economist, academic and communist.
Jozef Baláži, 78, Slovak football player and manager.
Leon Bender, 22, American football player, epilepsy.
Walter Carr, 73, Scottish actor and comedian.
William Moreton Condry, 80, English naturalist, kidney failure.
Robin Jackson, 49, Northern Irish loyalist paramilitary, lung cancer.
Jan Pickard, 70, South African rugby player.
Max Prieto, 79, Mexican football player.
Wolfram Röhrig, 81, German pianist, composer and conductor.

31
Sammy Collins, 75, English football player.
Lotti Huber, 85, German actress.
Valeriy Hubulov, 31, South Ossetian politician, murdered.
Michio Suzuki, 71, Japanese mathematician.
Charles Van Acker, 86, Belgian-American racecar driver.
Stanisław Wisłocki, 76, Polish conductor of classical music.

References 

1998-05
 05